Rashid Maidin (10 October 1917 – 1 September 2006), sometimes given as Rashid Mahideen, was a senior leader of the Communist Party of Malaya (CPM).

Personal life
He was born in Kampung Gunung Mesah, Gopeng, Perak; coincidentally on the same month and year as the October Revolution in the Russian Empire. He is the eldest brother of 7 brothers and 1 sister. He received his early education at the Gunung Panjang Malay School and the Kampung Gunung Mesah Madrasah, which were both in Gopeng. He graduated at standard 5 in a Malay school. However, due to poverty Rashid dropped out of school in 1929.

After leaving school, Rashid travelled and sought employment, ending up in Cameron Highlands, Pahang. While working odd jobs there, he befriended a Christian missionary who taught him to speak basic English. He furthered his proficiency in the language via correspondence courses. Later, Rashid returned to Gopeng and worked at a French-owned power station. While employed at the power station, he studied basic electrics and eventually obtained a first-class electrical chargeman certificate.

He started a family with  Hamidah binti Abdul Rashid, a village girl in 1938. They have 4 children, 3 sons and a daughter. The second marriage was in 1959, a comrade and a party cadet named Selamah binti Abdullah. They were gifted another daughter.

Involvement in politics
Rashid was also active in the trade unions, which led him to join the CPM as the party's first Malay member. In his memoir, Memoir Rashid Maidin: Daripada perjuangan bersenjata kepada perdamaian (The Memoirs of Rashid Maidin: From Armed Struggle to Peace), Rashid justified his decision to join the CPM due to the party's strong anti-imperialist stance. CPM was among the first anti-colonial movements in Malaya. Since young Rashid was inspired by the story of Maharajalela's war against the British in Perak. In 1939. he started to get involved in the Malayan Communist Party (MCP) and in 1941, he officially became a member of MCP. He was the first Malay joining MCP.

In 1941, the Imperial Japanese Army invaded and occupied Malaya. The MCP, of which Rashid by now was the party's top Malay leader, organised armed resistance via the Malayan People's Anti-Japanese Army (MPAJA). At the end of the Anti-Japanese war, he met Abdullah CD.

After the return of British rule, the CPM continued its armed insurrection, this time against the British colonial government, via its new militant wing, the Malayan National Libheration Army (MNLA). Rashid was entrusted by CPM leader Chin Peng to lead the MNLA's Malay-dominated 10th Regiment. In 1947, he was one of the representatives from CPM to attend a council communist party meeting in London. This meeting was participated by communist parties in the colonial country to discuss about the strategy to fight against colonialism for the right of independence. CPM's armed insurrection led the British to declare a state of emergency, which lasted between 1948 and 1960. in July 1948, he was caught by the British in Sungai Manik, Perak. He was put in jail for 3 and a half years. In the early 1952, he managed to free himself. After that in late 1952, Rashid met Abdullah CD in Pahang. Then in 1953, together with 10th Regiment, he retreated to the borders of Malaysia-Thailand. He was wounded on his leg during the battle against the British.

In 1955, the CPM attempted to negotiate peace with the colonial government. Rashid was a member of the CPM delegation at the talks, which were held at the town of Baling, Kedah. After the collapse of the Baling Talks, the CPM continued its insurrection. In between 1961 and 1972, he was assigned to lead the Special Unit of National Libriation Army in the borders of Kedah-Thailand. He returned and lead Rejimen the tenth till peace in 1972. However, due to government anti-insurrection measures, CPM's guerilla struggle gradually waned and eventually ended after a peace treaty was signed with the Malaysian government in Haadyai, Thailand in 1989. Rashid was again a CPM delegate to the peace treaty.

In January 2006, 500 former members of the Malayan Communist party were granted Thai citizenship. In the past, Rashid had failed to acquire Malaysian citizenship, like many other ex-communists living in Southern Thailand.

However, a stipulation in the treaty signed disallowed former senior CPM leaders from returning to Malaysia; hence, Rashid settled to a quiet, post-guerilla life in Southern Thailand. He died on 1 September 2006 in Si Sakhon, Narathiwat, and was buried after Friday prayers on the same day.

References

External links
 "Former top CPM leader dies at 89 in Narathiwat" - The Star, 2 September 2006

1917 births
2006 deaths
Malaysian politicians
Rashid Maidin
Malaysian Muslims
Malaysian people of Minangkabau descent
Malaysian communists